Euxoa obeliscoides, known generally as the obelisk dart or square-spot dart, is a species of cutworm or dart moth in the family Noctuidae. It is found in North America.

The MONA or Hodges number for Euxoa obeliscoides is 10817.

References

Further reading

 
 
 

Euxoa
Articles created by Qbugbot
Moths described in 1852